Michael C. Connell (born March 15, 1956) is a former American football punter in the National Football League (NFL) for the Washington Redskins and the San Francisco 49ers.  He played college football at the University of Cincinnati and was drafted in the tenth round of the 1978 NFL Draft.

1956 births
Living people
People from Sharon, Pennsylvania
Players of American football from Pennsylvania
American football punters
Cincinnati Bearcats football players
San Francisco 49ers players
Washington Redskins players